The 1988–89 John Player Special Trophy was the eighteenth season for the competition (named as such due to sponsorship from John Player & Sons).

Wigan won the final, beating Widnes by the score of 12-6. The match was played at Burnden Park, Bolton, Greater Manchester. The attendance was 20,709 and receipts were £94874.

Background 
This season saw no changes in the  entrants, no new members and no withdrawals, the number remaining at thirty-six
Huddersfield dropped the  "Barracuda" suffix and the  ground reverted to the traditional Fartown name, much to the relief of most of the fans - and - Springfield Borough moved to Chorley after only one season and re-branded themselves Chorley Borough, playing at Victory Park, the home of Chorley FC

Competition and results

Preliminary round 

Involved  4 matches and 8 Clubs

Round 1 - First  Round 

Involved  16 matches and 32 Clubs

Round 2 - Second  Round 

Involved  8 matches and 16 Clubs

Round 3 -Quarter Finals 

Involved 4 matches with 8 clubs

Round 3 -Quarter Finals - Replays 
Involved 1 match with 2 clubs

Round 4 – Semi-Finals 

Involved 2 matches and 4 Clubs

Final

Teams and scorers 

Scoring - Try = four points - Goal = two points - Drop goal = one point

Timeline in the  final

Prize money 
As part of the sponsorship deal and funds, the  prize money awarded to the competing teams for this season is as follows :-

Note - the  author is unable to trace the award amounts for this season. Can anyone help ?

The road to success 
This tree excludes any preliminary round fixtures

Notes and comments 
1 * Wigan St Patricks are a Junior (amateur) club from Wigan
2 * Elland are a Junior (amateur) club from the Halifax area of Yorkshire
3 * Runcorn Highfield forfeited home advantage for a larger gate. Runcorn Players were also in dispute and the club fielded a very reduced strength team comprised a number of trialists and reserves (and coach Bill Ashurst, (an  ex Wigan player) who came out of retirement especially to play, and was disappointedly sent off 12 minutes after coming off the subs bench)
4 * A Wigan record victory in this tournament
5 * The highest score, highest score by home team and highest winning margin in the  competition, between all clubs to date
6 * RUGBYLEAGUEproject and Widnes official archives give the  score as 37-12 but Wigan official archives gives it as 37-2   
7  * Burnden Park was the home of English football club Bolton Wanderers from 1895 to 1997. It hosted the 1900-01 FA Cup Final replay in which Tottenham Hotspur beat Sheffield United 3.1. The record attendance was for a 6th round F A Cup match with Stoke City (Stanley Matthews played for Stoke at the time) at which, although the ground capacity was set at 70,000, an estimated 85,000 fans crowded in, and when two crush barriers broke, the result was 33 fans killed and another 400 injured. The capacity at closure was a mere 25,000

General information for those unfamiliar 
The council of the Rugby Football League voted to introduce a new competition, to be similar to The Football Association and Scottish Football Association's "League Cup". It was to be a similar knock-out structure to, and to be secondary to, the Challenge Cup. As this was being formulated, sports sponsorship was becoming more prevalent and as a result John Player and Sons, a division of Imperial Tobacco Company, became sponsors, and the competition never became widely known as the "League Cup" 
The competition ran from 1971-72 until 1995-96 and was initially intended for the professional clubs plus the two amateur BARLA National Cup finalists. In later seasons the entries were expanded to take in other amateur and French teams. The competition was dropped due to "fixture congestion" when Rugby League became a summer sport
The Rugby League season always (until the onset of "Summer Rugby" in 1996) ran from around August-time through to around May-time and this competition always took place early in the season, in the Autumn, with the final usually taking place in late January 
The competition was variably known, by its sponsorship name, as the Player's No.6 Trophy (1971–1977), the John Player Trophy (1977–1983), the John Player Special Trophy (1983–1989), and the Regal Trophy in 1989.

See also 
1988–89 Rugby Football League season
1988 Lancashire Cup
1988 Yorkshire Cup
John Player Special Trophy
Rugby league county cups

References

External links
Saints Heritage Society
1896–97 Northern Rugby Football Union season at wigan.rlfans.com 
Hull&Proud Fixtures & Results 1896/1897
Widnes Vikings - One team, one passion Season In Review - 1896-97
The Northern Union at warringtonwolves.org
Huddersfield R L Heritage
Wakefield until I die

1988 in English rugby league
1989 in English rugby league
League Cup (rugby league)